The 1909–10 Hong Kong First Division League season was the second since its establishment.

League table

References
1909–10 Hong Kong First Division table (RSSSF)

1909-10
1909–10 domestic association football leagues
1909 in Hong Kong
1910 in Hong Kong